Ricky Van Shelton Sings Christmas is the first Holiday album by country music artist Ricky Van Shelton. It was released following the success of his first two albums. The album includes versions of traditional and popular Christmas songs, along with two older country Christmas songs, Willie Nelson's "Pretty Paper", and Eddy Arnold's "C-H-R-I-S-T-M-A-S". It also includes two original songs, "Country Christmas", and "Christmas Long Ago".

Track listing
"I'll Be Home for Christmas" (Kim Gannon, Walter Kent, Buck Ram) – 3:06
"White Christmas" (Irving Berlin) – 3:19
"Santa Claus Is Coming to Town" (J. Fred Coots, Haven Gillespie) – 1:52
"Silver Bells" (Ray Evans, Jay Livingston) – 3:09
"Silent Night" (Franz Xaver Gruber, Joseph Mohr) – 2:20
"C-H-R-I-S-T-M-A-S" (Eddy Arnold, Jenny Lou Carson) – 2:49
"Please Come Home for Christmas" (Charles Brown, Gene Redd) – 2:33
"Pretty Paper" (Willie Nelson) – 2:48
"Country Christmas" (Don Schlitz, Ricky Van Shelton) – 2:35
"Christmas Long Ago" (Schlitz, Van Shelton) – 3:09
"What Child Is This? (Greensleeves)" (William Chatterton Dix, Traditional) – 3:07

Personnel
Eddie Bayers – drums
George Binkley III – violin
Mark Casstevens – acoustic guitar
Roy Christensen – cello
Al DeLory – piano
Conni Ellisor – violin
Paul Franklin – steel guitar
Steve Gibson – electric guitar, mandolin
Carl Gorodetzky – violin
Roy Huskey Jr. – upright bass
Ted Madsen – violin
Randy McCormick – piano
Dennis Molchan – violin
Craig Nelson – upright bass
Louis Dean Nunley – background vocals
Mark O'Connor – fiddle, mandolin
Tom Robb – bass guitar
John Wesley Ryles – background vocals
Pamela Sixfin – violin
Ricky Van Shelton – acoustic guitar, lead vocals
Gary Vanosdale – violin
Kristin Wilkinson – violin
Dennis Wilson – background vocals
Curtis Young – background vocals
Additional background vocals by "5th Avenue".

Chart performance

1989 Christmas albums
Christmas albums by American artists
Ricky Van Shelton albums
Columbia Records Christmas albums
Albums produced by Steve Buckingham (record producer)
Country Christmas albums